North Macedonia, following its independence from Yugoslavia in 1991, made its Paralympic Games début at the 1996 Summer Paralympics in Atlanta, where it sent a single athlete (Branimir Jovanovski) to compete in shooting. The country has competed in every subsequent edition of the Summer Paralympics, with very small delegations. It has never taken part in the Winter Paralympics. The only athletes to have represented North Macedonia at the Paralympic Games are Branimir Jovanovski (1996–2004), Vanco Karanfilov (2000–2016) and Olivera Nakovska (2004–2020), all three in shooting events.

At the 2004 Games in Athens, Karanfilov won North Macedonia's first Paralympic medal as independent country: a silver in the men's air pistol event (category SH1).

At the 2012 Games in London, Olivera Nakovska-Bikova won North Macedonia's first gold Paralympic medal as independent country: a gold medal in women's air pistol event (category SH1), setting new world and Paralympic record at qualifiers for Women's P2-10m Air Pistol-SH1 with 381 points, and also setting new Paralympic finals record for Women's P2-10m Air Pistol-SH1 with 475.7 points.

Medallists

Several other athletes from the Socialist Republic of Macedonia (a constituent country of the former SFR Yugoslavia) have also won Olympic medals, competing as part of Yugoslavia, and as Independent Paralympic Participants

As part of SFR Yugoslavia:

As Independent Paralympic Participants:

See also
 North Macedonia at the Olympics

References